Empress Dowager Zhang (張太后) may refer to:

Empress Dowager Zhang (Former Zhao) (died 313), empress dowager of the Han Zhao dynasty
Empress Dowager Zhang (Liu Song dynasty) (died 426), empress dowager of the Liu Song dynasty
Empress Zhang (Hongxi) (1379–1442), empress dowager of the Ming dynasty
Empress Zhang (Hongzhi) (1471–1541), empress dowager of the Ming dynasty

See also
 Empress Zhang (disambiguation)

Zhang